Henry Redhead Yorke, in early life Henry Redhead (1772–1813) was an English writer and radical publicist.

Life
Redhead was born and brought up in Barbuda, to a mother who was a freed slave from Barbuda and a father who was an Antiguan plantation owner and manager. He was subsequently taken to England, and raised at Little Eaton, in Derbyshire. It is now considered probable that his parents were Samuel Redhead (died 1785) and Sarah Bullock.

In Paris in 1792, Yorke witnessed Louis XVI's appearance before the convention and was close to the Sheares brothers, and others of the so-called "British Club". He fell out with the British radicals over revolutionary politics, getting into disputes with John Oswald. He baulked at a clause in a proposed and defeated resolution of 11 January 1793 encouraging an English insurgency; and as a result was denounced by the economic writer Robert Rayment. Redhead was then the target of an arrest warrant made out by Jacques-Louis David, and left France. From this time Redhead added Yorke to his name.

On his return to England Yorke joined a radical society at Derby, which sent him in 1793 to Sheffield to assist another such society. On 7 April 1794 he addressed a large outdoor meeting at Sheffield, convened to petition for a pardon to Scottish radicals convicted in political trials and to promote the abolitionist cause. His description was circulated to the chief magistrates of Liverpool, Newcastle, Sunderland, Shields, Hull and Carlisle which led to his arrest in Lincolnshire for the expression of revolutionary sentiments, through the collaboration of Richard Acklom Harrison, Collector of Customs in Hull and John Wray, Mayor of Barton, Lincolnshire.

At the York spring assize of 1795 true bills were found against him for conspiracy, sedition, and libel. On 23 July 1795 Yorke was tried at York before Sir Giles Rooke for conspiracy, in the absence of his co-defendants, including Joseph Gales, who had absconded. Yorke advocated parliamentary reform, but declared himself opposed to violence and anarchy. On 27 November 1795 he was sentenced by the King's Bench to two years' imprisonment in Dorchester Castle, fined, and required to give sureties of good behaviour for seven years.

Yorke was released in March 1798. His writings from then on showed support for the war policy of the Pitt administration, and he wrote on 3 August 1798 a private letter to William Wickham condemning the views of the Sheares brothers. He was a student of the Inner Temple from 1801, and revisited France in 1802. In 1806 he was near having a duel with Sir Francis Burdett, both parties being bound over to keep the peace.

Yorke suffered periods of serious illness, and died at Chelsea on 28 January 1813.

Works
In 1792, under his original name Redhead, he published a pamphlet against the abolition of slavery, but his opinions changed soon afterwards.

In a Letter to the Reformers (Dorchester, 1798), written in prison, Yorke justified the war with France. He wrote letters for twelve months in The Star under the signature of Alfred or Galgacus (these were reprinted in a short volume), and was part proprietor of the True Briton.

In 1801, and again in 1811, Yorke issued synopses of lectures in London on political and historical subjects. After a bout of illness, he was asked by Richard Valpy to undertake an expansion of John Campbell's Lives of British Admirals, but left the work incomplete.

Yorke also published:

 a letter to John Frost (1750–1842), entitled These are the Times that try Men's Souls, 1793;
 a report on his trial, 1795; 
 Thoughts on Civil Government, 1800; 
 Annals of Political Economy, 1803; 
 Letters from France, 1804; 
 Mr Redhead Yorke's Political Review, 1805–11. Considered eccentric, the review admired Edmund Burke but was anti-Catholic.

Family
Yorke married, in 1800, the daughter of Mr. Andrews, keeper of Dorchester Castle, and had four children. Among them was Henry Galgacus Redhead Yorke, Member of Parliament.

Notes

Attribution

1772 births
1813 deaths
English biographers
English male non-fiction writers
People from Little Eaton
Black British writers